Sebastopol is a village community in the north east part of the Riverina, in New South Wales, Australia. It is situated about 15 kilometres south of Temora and 19 kilometres north of Junee Reefs.

It was named after Sevastopol, the site of an important battle during the Crimean War. Sebastopol Post Office opened on 7 March 1870 and closed in 1973. Sebastopol had a school from 1871 to 1949.

Near Sebastopol is the 248 hectare site of a 90 Mega-Watt solar farm that became operational in December 2021.

Notes and references

Towns in the Riverina
Towns in New South Wales
Temora Shire
Mining towns in New South Wales